William Aloysius Boylan (January 6, 1869 – July 8, 1940) was the first President of Brooklyn College.

Career
Boylan was born in New York City, to Arthur and Anne Boylan. He attended St. Francis Xavier College (B.A. and M.A.), New York University (Master of Pedagogy), and Fordham University (Doctor of Philosophy).

In his career, he was District Superintendent of Schools (beginning in 1913) and Associate Superintendent of Schools, with the New York City Board of Education (beginning in 1927). 

Jimmy Walker, the Mayor of New York City, appointed Boylan the first President of Brooklyn College in May 1930. Boylan resigned as President and retired in September 1938 due to illness, as he was suffering from neuritis, and died on July 8, 1940, at 71 years of age.

He wrote textbooks on reading, writing, and mathematics.  Boylan co-authored City Arithmetics, Charles E. Merrill Company (1916), Correct Spelling for Graded Schools, Laurel Book Company (1929), and Graded Drill Exercises in Corrective English, Noble and Noble, Incorporated (1939).

Boylan Hall, on the campus of Brooklyn College, was originally called the “Academic Building,” and was later named after Boylan.

References

External links
William A. Boylan, "A New Brooklyn College Is Rising," The New York Times, December 8, 1935

1869 births
Xavier High School (New York City) alumni
New York University alumni
Fordham University alumni
People from New York City
School superintendents in New York (state)
Presidents of Brooklyn College
1940 deaths
New York City Department of Education